The 2023 National Camogie League, known for sponsorship reasons as the Very Ireland Camogie Leagues, commences in February 2023. It is a secondary competition for camogie county teams, as well as some intermediate (second-string) county teams, held in spring prior to the All-Ireland Senior Camogie Championship.

Format

League structure
The 2023 National Camogie League consists of six divisions:

Division 1A contains 6 teams 
Division 1B contains 6 teams 
Division 2A contains 6 teams 
Division 2B contains 5 teams 
Division 3A contains 8 teams, divided into two groups of 4
Division 3B contains 5 teams 

Each team plays every other team in its division once, except in 3A where teams only play the teams in their own group. 3 points are awarded for a win and 1 for a draw. 

If two teams are level on points, the tie-break is:
 winners of the head-to-head game are ranked ahead
 if the head-to-head match was a draw, ranking is determined by the points difference (i.e. total scored minus total conceded in all games)
 if the points difference is equal, ranking is determined by the total scored

If three or more teams are level on league points, rankings are determined solely by points difference.

Finals and relegation 
In Division 1A, the top two teams meet in the Camogie League final. The last-placed team is relegated.

In Division 1B, the top two teams meet in the final, with the division champions promoted. The last-placed team is relegated.

In Division 2A, the top two teams meet in the final, with the division champions promoted. The last-placed team is relegated.

In Division 2B, the top two teams meet in the final, with the division champions promoted. The last-placed team is relegated.

In Division 3A, the top two in each group meet in the semi-finals, with the division champions promoted. The last-placed team in each group goes into the relegation playoff, with the losers relegated.

In Division 3B, the top two teams meet in the final, with the division champions promoted.

Fixtures and results

Division 1A

Final

Division 1B

Final

References

External link
Official site

League
National Camogie League seasons